Bro Radio is a community radio station broadcasting to Barry, Llantwit Major, Penarth and surrounding areas in the Vale of Glamorgan, South Wales.

The station broadcasts on 98.1FM in Barry and the central Vale, on 98.4FM in the St Athan and Rhoose areas, on 100.2FM in Llantwit Major and western parts of the Vale, and on 106.1FM in Penarth and the surrounding area.

Overview

Apart from national news bulletins, most of the station's output is produced and presented locally by a team of 60 volunteers, a paid operations director and a sales & finance manager.

In August 2020, plans were announced to broadcast in Penarth and the Eastern Vale of Glamorgan.

In December 2020, Bro Radio was named Station of the Year at the annual Community Radio Awards.

The following year, the station began broadcasting on 106.1FM to Penarth and the Eastern Vale, along with another relay on 98.4FM for the St Athan and Rhoose areas.

Programming 

Bro Radio's schedule consists of locally produced programming including music-led daytime output, local news and sport, current affairs and features, events coverage, and specialist programming during the evenings and at weekends.

As of September 2021, the station produces around 110 hours per week, including monthly programmes on business, culture, volunteering and youth affairs, along with a monthly bilingual show on Welsh language music.

News and current affairs 

Bro Radio's newsroom produces and broadcasts local news bulletins on the half hour from 7.30am to 10.30am and from 1.30pm to 6.30pm on weekdays, with local headlines on the hour during Vale Drive.

The station also produces a weekly current affairs programme, The Vale This Week, on Wednesday evenings, along with an online local news service.

The station also airs hourly national bulletins from Sky News Radio 24 hours a day.

References

External links
Official website

Community radio stations in the United Kingdom
Radio stations in Wales
Radio stations established in 2009
Barry, Vale of Glamorgan